Herman Koeckemann, formally Bernard Hermann Koeckemann, SS.CC., (January 10, 1828 – February 22, 1892), served as the second vicar apostolic of the Vicariate Apostolic of the Sandwich Islands — now the Roman Catholic Diocese of Honolulu — from 1881 to 1892.

Biography 
Born in Ostbevern, Westphalia, Germany, he was baptized as Bernard. At the age of 14, his father, a farmer, sent him to the Gymnasium of Münster. Koeckemann was an excellent student and excelled in classical studies. During his seven years of college, his progress in Latin, Greek, Hebrew and French and in philosophy and science was so well marked that at the graduation, his examiners dispensed with the oral examination as superfluous.

Believing himself called to religious life, he went to Leuven and entered the Congregation of the Sacred Hearts of Jesus and Mary. After a novitiate of eighteen months, he was admitted to religious profession on April 11, 1851, taking the name Herman. After three years of theologate, he was sent by his superiors to the Kingdom of Hawaii for work as a missionary. He arrived in Honolulu on November 13, 1854 and was subsequently ordained to the priesthood as a member of the Congregation of the Sacred Hearts of Jesus and Mary on May 31, 1862 at the age of 34.

Koeckemann served as pastor to the fledgling Catholic community of native Hawaiians. When Msgr. Louis Maigret fell ill, Father Koeckemann was appointed coadjutor vicar apostolic to fulfill some of the bishop's regular duties. On August 21, 1881, Father Koeckemann was ordained at Saint Mary's Cathedral in San Francisco, California, as a bishop of the titular see of Olba at the age of 53, with a papal mandate to serve as coadjutor Vicar Apostolic with right of succession.

Upon Msgr. Maigret's death, Msgr. Koeckemann succeeded as vicar apostolic on June 11, 1882. During his episcopate, the massive migration of Portuguese workers for the sugarcane plantations from Madeira Islands and the Azores began.  With the subsequent increase in population from these migrations, Msgr. Koeckemann made Catholic education a priority of the Vicariate and built many schools.  He died in Honolulu in 1892 and was buried at the Honolulu Catholic Cemetery in downtown Honolulu.

Order of Kalākaua
King David Kalākaua bestowed on Herman the honor "Knight Commander of the Royal Order of Kalākaua" in 1881.

Sources

1828 births
1892 deaths
Apostolic vicars of the Hawaiian Islands
Picpus Fathers
Catholic University of Leuven (1834–1968) alumni
Roman Catholic missionaries in Hawaii
Recipients of the Royal Order of Kalākaua
Burials at Honolulu Catholic Cemetery